David Mair (born 21 August 1984 in Sterzing) is an Italian artificial track luger who has competed since 2003.

Mair's best finish at the FIL European Luge Championships was 12th in the men's singles event at Winterberg in 2006. His best finish at the FIL World Luge Championships was ninth in the men's singles event at Lake Placid, New York in 2009.

Mair qualified for the 2010 Winter Olympics where he finished 17th.

References
 FIL-Luge profile (Note: all results until 2002 belongs to the natural track luger of the same name)

External links 
 
 
 

1984 births
Living people
Italian male lugers
Olympic lugers of Italy
Lugers at the 2010 Winter Olympics
Italian lugers
Sportspeople from Sterzing
Lugers of Centro Sportivo Carabinieri